Early Bird may refer to:

Arts and entertainment

Film, television and theater
 The Early Bird (1925 film), an American silent comedy film
 The Early Bird (1936 film), a British comedy film directed by Donovan Pedelty 
 The Early Bird, a 1965 British comedy film starring Norman Wisdom
 The Early Bird (play) a 2006 play by Leo Butler
 The Early Bird Show, a 1980s Australian children's TV show
 Early Bird, a fictional character in The Angry Birds Movie

Literature
 "Early Bird" (short story), a 1973 story by Theodore R. Cogswell and Theodore L. Thomas
 The Early Bird, a 1968 children's book by Richard Scarry
 Early Bird: A Memoir of Premature Retirement, a 2005 book by Rodney Rothman

Music
 Early Bird Records, a jazz record label
 The Earlybirds, a New Zealand pop-rock band
 "Early Bird", an instrumental by André Brasseur, 1965
 "Early Bird", a song by Erasure from Storm Chaser, 2007
 "Earlybird", a song by Van der Graaf Generator from ALT, 2012

Aviation and satellites
 Early Bird Aircraft Company, an American aircraft manufacturer
 Early Bird 1, a 1997 earth observation satellite launched for EarthWatch, Inc.
 Intelsat I, a 1965 communications satellite nicknamed "Early Bird"

Other uses
 Early Bird, Florida, US, an unincorporated community
 Early bird dinner, a dinner served earlier than traditional dinner hours, particularly at a restaurant
 Early Bird, a train of the PATrain commuter rail service
 Birdie the Early Bird, a McDonald's mascot
 Lark (person), or early bird, a person who gets up early in the morning

See also
 The Early Bird Catches the Worm, a 2008 Italian film
 "Early Birdie", a song by Owl City from Maybe I'm Dreaming
 Early Birds of Aviation, an organization devoted to the history of early pilots